1350 aluminium alloy is nearly pure aluminium consist of minimum of weight percentage of 99.5% of Aluminium.

Chemical Composition

Physical Properties

Other Designations

Applications 
 Electrical conductors.

References

Aluminium alloy table